Confluence is an annual science fiction convention that has been occurring in Pittsburgh since 1988.

History
The ninth annual convention garnered over 400 science fiction fans in 1996. The original name was derived from the meaning of Confluence, a gathering, and the fact that Pittsburgh is at the confluence of three rivers. The event has been organized by PARSEC, the Pittsburgh Area Real Time Science Fiction Enthusiasts Club.

2020 saw a virtual convention, called C'monfluence.

Events
Confluence is a convention, focused primarily on the literature and art of science fiction, fantasy and horror. Events include panel discussions, talks, poetry readings, filk concerts, a video room, and more.

References

External links
 Official Website

Science fiction conventions in the United States
Recurring events established in the 1980s
1980s establishments in Pennsylvania
Annual events in Pennsylvania
Festivals in Pennsylvania
Tourist attractions in Pennsylvania
Conventions in Pennsylvania